XTR-101 and XTR-102 are a pair of automatic close-defense 20mm remote weapon systems produced by the National Chung-Shan Institute of Science and Technology of Taiwan. The XTR-101 features a single T-75 cannon while the XTR-102 features two of them mounted side by side. Along with associated sensors, power, and command and control equipment the system forms a Short-Range Automated Defense Weapon System (SADWS).

Description 
The turrets can rotate 360° at a maximum speed of 60° per second at an elevation from −15° to 85°. Both systems feature onboard optical imagery identification, target tracking, and fire control. It can be mounted on armored vehicles, naval vessels, and fixed ground positions.

Development 
With the looming end of conscription and the growing power of the Peoples Liberation Army the Republic of China Armed Forces started looking for ways to automate hazardous and remote coastal defenses. The T-75 revolver cannon is based on the American M39 cannon and was developed in Taiwan. The weapon systems were first exhibited at the Taipei Aerospace & Defense Technology Exhibition in 2013. Testing began in 2014 with live fire trials held at a naval base in Kinmen County.

Service history 
The Republic of China Navy has deployed twenty XTR-102 systems in Wuqiu Township, Kinmen County. The Republic of China Army plans to deploy the systems in Dongyin, Kinmen (Quemoy), Matsu, Wuhu and Danshuihe.

In 2019 the Navy ordered three additional XTR-102 systems. The contract value was NT$286 million (US$9.26 million) with delivery by December 2022.

See also 
 Sentry gun
 Remote controlled weapon station
 Page on Chinese wikipedia

References

External links 
 Manufacturer's video: 

Remote weapon stations
Weapons of the Republic of China
Weapons and ammunition introduced in 2017